Medco Pond is a lake in the U.S. state of Oregon.

Medco Pond took its name from Medford Corporation (Medco), a local lumber operation.

References

Landforms of Jackson County, Oregon
Lakes of Oregon